The National Intelligence and Security Service (NISS) is an intelligence agency of the Ethiopian federal government tasked with gathering information of national interests. It does counter-terrorism in the country by informing the federal police, gathering intelligence for the Ethiopian National Defense Force, and information for local law enforcement. The NISS is under the provision of the Ministry of Peace. It reports to the ministry of its tasks and missions. It was re-established in 2013 and renamed the National Intelligence and Security Service.

Duties and mission 
The National Intelligence and Security Service mission is regarded to deal with counter-terrorism, and gathering information for the public safety.

Legal authority 
The National Intelligence and Security Service in 2019 showed legal authority and imposed a travel ban on 3,000 individuals from moving out into other countries. This was disclosed after MP's had visited the headquarters of the institution.

Cooperation in counter-terrorism with foreign law enforcement and spy agencies  
Cooperation with foreign law enforcement and spy agencies has extended to countries like the U.S, Russia, and Israel. In August 2019, the NISS and the U.S Federal Bureau of Investigation (FBI), signed a memorandum of understanding to jointly combat terrorism. In November 2020, the NISS and Israeli intelligence agency Mossad, had agreed to fight in counter-terrorism operations jointly. And on 9 June 2021, the Russian government and NISS had agreed to strengthen cooperation in joint counter-terrorism.

Rebranding and changes 
The NISS over its three decades of existence has made politically motivated arrests, torture, to journalists who oppose the government's points of views, and individuals. The NISS in its rebranding allowed for parliamentary over sight in its conductions of duties and day to day works. News media agencies were allowed also to report on the parliamentary oversight NISS even if most media were government owned and state affiliated one private media was allowed also the Reporter. In an effort to rebrand the institution, NISS will have a new name— the National Intelligence Center (NIC) — as well as a new logo, Demelash (former director of NISS) said. Going in to the merits of the restructuring, Demelash talked about a draft law, currently under scrutiny in the Council of Ministers, which is expected to refer it to the House People’s Representatives where it will be ratified. According to Demelash, the new law will clearly demarcate the powers and functions of the intelligence service, and ensure that the activities are subject to institutional oversight and appropriate safeguards. The bill also incorporates an article that will prevent all officers of agency from having any affiliation with political parties so that the intelligence service operation is fully independent and has professional integrity. The officers and the intelligence service, in general, will not have any engagement with activities supporting or promoting or influencing political objectives of any kind, advanced by any lawful political party, organization and group. The bill also plans to suspend the intelligence service from conducting any security vetting or monitoring works over legal political parties or institutions connected to the freedom of expression.

Training with Republican Guard 
The NISS also is tasked with graduating and training Republican Guards in the University of National Intelligence and Security. "The Republican Guard students must graduate The National Intelligence and Security University College, which is administrated by NISS. This University which is operated by the National Intelligence and Security Service is meant to train them in their disciplinary duties, after they finish and complete their physical trainings in Ethiopia."

References 

Government agencies of Ethiopia
Intelligence agencies
Security organizations